Kevin Michael Polcovich (born June 28, 1970) is an American former professional baseball player who was a utility infielder for the Pittsburgh Pirates in two Major League Baseball seasons during the 1990s.

Early life
Polcovich was born in Auburn, New York. He attended Auburn High School, and played for the Auburn Maroons baseball team.

Collegiate career
Polcovich attended Gulf Coast Community College, and in 1990 he played collegiate summer baseball with the Hyannis Mets of the Cape Cod Baseball League. He received an athletic scholarship to attend the University of Florida in Gainesville, Florida, where he played shortstop for coach Joe Arnold's Florida Gators baseball team in 1991 and 1992. He participated in the College World Series in 1991, and received All-Southeastern Conference (SEC), SEC All-Tournament, and College World Series All-Tournament honors. Polcovich holds the NCAA D1 fielding assists record with 14.

Professional career
The Pittsburgh Pirates selected Polcovich in the 30th round of the 1992 amateur draft. He made his Major League debut on May 17, 1997.

Polcovich is most remembered for his key role as a member of Pittsburgh's 1997 "Freak Show" team. Prior to the season, new ownership had dismantled the team and launched one of the Pirates frequent rebuilding plans. Opening day payroll for the '97 team was $9,000,000, by far the lowest in the major leagues. Expectations were very low for the Pirates, but perhaps none were lower than for Polcovich, who was bagging groceries to help support himself during spring training. When the Pirates' starting shortstop was injured in May, Polcovich got his call-up to the majors and the former bag boy was now the new starting shortstop. He quickly became the anchor of the Pirates infield and helped the team compete for the NL Central Division until the final week of the season (when they were finally eliminated by ultimate division champions, the Houston Astros).

Polcovich only played one more year of major league baseball, but his Rocky-like rise from nowhere to help the upstart 1997 Pirates have their most competitive year in the past two decades (as of 2012) against overwhelming odds, remains part of recent Pirate lore.

Personal life
Polcovich and his wife, Lisa, have two children, Kaden James and Teagan. Kaden was drafted in the third-round of the 2020 Major League Baseball Draft by the Seattle Mariners. Kaden is an infielder who attended Oklahoma State University. Teagan is a volleyball player for Missouri State University.

See also 

List of Florida Gators baseball players
Pittsburgh Pirates all-time roster

References

External links 

1970 births
Living people
Sportspeople from Auburn, New York
Auburn High School (Auburn, New York) alumni
Florida Gators baseball players
Hyannis Harbor Hawks players
Pittsburgh Pirates players
Major League Baseball third basemen
Major League Baseball second basemen
Major League Baseball shortstops
Nashville Sounds players
San Angelo Colts players
Baseball players from New York (state)
American expatriate baseball players in Mexico
Augusta Pirates players
Calgary Cannons players
Carolina Mudcats players
Columbus Clippers players
Memphis Redbirds players
Salem Buccaneers players
Anchorage Bucs players